Jeremy Edwards is a retired British and Welsh rower who competed for Great Britain and Wales.

Rowing career
Edwards was part of the lightweight coxless four that reached the final and finished fifth at the 1977 World Rowing Championships in Amsterdam.

In 1986 he rowed for Wales at the 1986 Commonwealth Games in the lightweight coxless four.

References

Living people
British male rowers
Welsh male rowers
Year of birth missing (living people)
Rowers at the 1986 Commonwealth Games
Commonwealth Games competitors for Wales